Polysarcus denticauda is a species of insect belonging to the family Tettigoniidae  subfamily Phaneropterinae. It is found in France, Germany, Hungary, Austria, Czech Republic, Slovak Republic,  Albania, Croatia, Bosnia and Herzegovina, Greece,  European Turkey and  Bulgaria. The habitat is long grass meadows with lush vegetation. Such meadows should be mowed late and fertilized only slightly.

References

Orthoptera of Europe
Phaneropterinae